Oussama Haddadi (born 28 January 1992) is a Tunisian professional footballer who plays as a defender for German  club Greuther Fürth and the Tunisia national team.

Club career
On 30 January 2017, Haddadi joined Ligue 1 side Dijon, signing a -year contract with the club.

On 29 May 2019, Al-Ettifaq announced the signing of Haddadi from Dijon for the 2019–20 season having agreed a four-year contract.

On 21 January 2020, Al-Ettifaq announced that it loaned Haddadi for a year and a half to Kasımpaşa.

On 14 June 2022, Haddadi signed a two-year contract with Greuther Fürth in Germany.

International career
On 27 March 2015, Haddadi made his international debut for Tunisia against Japan. In May 2018, he was named in Tunisia's 23-man squad for the 2018 FIFA World Cup in Russia. He was selected in the final 23.

Career statistics

International

Honours
Tunisia
Africa Cup of Nations Fourth place: 2019

References

External links

Living people
1992 births
Footballers from Tunis
Tunisian footballers
Tunisia international footballers
Tunisian expatriate footballers
Club Africain players
Dijon FCO players
Ettifaq FC players
Kasımpaşa S.K. footballers
Yeni Malatyaspor footballers
SpVgg Greuther Fürth players
Tunisian Ligue Professionnelle 1 players
Ligue 1 players
Saudi Professional League players
Süper Lig players
2. Bundesliga players
Expatriate footballers in France
Expatriate footballers in Saudi Arabia
Expatriate footballers in Turkey
Expatriate footballers in Germany
Tunisian expatriate sportspeople in France
Tunisian expatriate sportspeople in Saudi Arabia
Tunisian expatriate sportspeople in Turkey
Tunisian expatriate sportspeople in Germany
Association football fullbacks
2018 FIFA World Cup players
2019 Africa Cup of Nations players
2021 Africa Cup of Nations players